In telecommunication, the term power failure transfer has the following meanings:

The switching of primary utilities to their secondary backup whenever the primary source operates outside its design parameters. This is accomplished via a transfer switch.
In telephony, a function which, when activated in the event of a commercial power failure or a low-voltage battery condition at a subscriber location, supplies power to predesignated subscriber equipment via the central office trunk.

Power-failure transfer is an emergency mode of operation in which one and only one instrument may be powered from each trunk line from the subscriber location to the central office.

References

Engineering failures